Doralice Santos (born 23 October 1963) commonly known as Doralice is a Brazilian footballer who played as a defender for the Brazil women's national football team. She was part of the team at the 1991 FIFA Women's World Cup. At the club level, she plays for EC Radar in Brazil.

References

External links
 

1963 births
Living people
Brazilian women's footballers
Brazil women's international footballers
Place of birth missing (living people)
1991 FIFA Women's World Cup players
Women's association football defenders